The 15709 / 10 New Jalpaiguri Malda Town Express is an Express train belonging to Indian Railways Eastern Railway zone that runs between  and  of West Bengal  in India.

Route
New Jalpaiguri (Siliguri) (Starts)
 
 
 
 
 
 
 
 
 
 
 
 
  
 
 
 
 
 
 
 
 
 
 
  (Ends)'''

References

Express trains in India
Transport in Jalpaiguri
Rail transport in West Bengal
Northeast Frontier Railway zone
Transport in Maldah